Legacy Tower (formerly Bausch & Lomb Place) is a skyscraper located in Rochester, New York. It was constructed in 1994, making it the latest skyscraper of Rochester, New York, and was the world headquarters for the contact lenses, lens care products, pharmaceuticals, intraocular lenses, and eye surgery products company Bausch & Lomb. Bausch & Lomb left the building in 2014 and was sold to 2 local developers, Robert C. Morgan & Cos  and Buckingham Properties.

See also
List of tallest buildings in Rochester, New York
List of tallest buildings in Upstate New York

References

Skyscraper office buildings in Rochester, New York
Office buildings completed in 1995
1995 establishments in New York (state)